Andik Vermansah (born 23 November 1991 in Jember, East Java) is an Indonesian professional footballer who plays as a winger for Liga 1 club Bhayangkara. He is one of ten Asian players to watch in 2012 by ESPN Soccernet.

Early life
Andik was born in Jember, East Java, to Saman, a coolie, and Jumiah, a tailor, both indigenous Javanese. He spent his childhood selling ice as a means of earning money for his family. His parents, earning barely enough money for living expenditures, had little fund to help Andik realise his dream as a footballer. At first Andik was not allowed to pursue his footballing career due to his family's economic condition. However, a strongly motivated Andik did not gave up on his dream of becoming a professional footballer. He did everything he could to pursue his dream by all means and to fund his burgeoning career he had to sell cake and ice, even playing football for inter-village tournament, just to be able to buy a pair of football shoes. Andik received his big break when the coach of SSB Suryanaga, Rudi, discovered his talents. Rudi offered Andik to play at a football academy in Jember, free of charge.

Club career

Early career
Andik started his career with Persebaya (1927) U-18. With Persebaya (1927) U-18, Andik won the   East Java Regional Youth League in 2007. And in that year, Andik presented gold medals to the city of Surabaya in the Provincial Sports Week.

In 2008, Andik had a big role in bringing home the gold medal for East Java at National Sports Week, which was held in Kalimantan.

Persebaya
Andik joined Persebaya after a successful trial. He succeeded in the trial due to his immense potential and ability. After joining the club, he continued working hard and impressed many with his pace and dribbling ability and eventually broke into Persebaya's first team. And at the age of 17, he was one of the youngest players in the squad at the time. He made his official debut for Persebaya on 29 August 2008, coming on in the 77th minute in a 2-0 victory against Persekabpas Pasuruan.

In October 2011, Serie A Giant Inter Milan was interested in him. On 7 September 2012, Andik joined Major League Soccer side D.C. United on trial and played several times for their reserve team but did not sign a contract with them and eventually returned to Persebaya .

On 6 October 2013 following a trial in Ventforet Kofu, in his debut he scored a goal in a reserves match against Shimizu S-Pulse. His performance made headlines in Japanese newspapers and impressed the 2,000 supporters in attendance.

Selangor
On 1 December 2013, Andik joined Malaysia Super League side Selangor on a two-years contract. He chose Selangor because they offered him a bigger salary than the salary offered by Ventforet Kofu. His salary ( rumoured $150,000/yr.) would make him one of the best paid Indonesian athletes.

Andik made his first Selangor debut in the 2014 Malaysia FA Cup in a 0–2 win against Harimau Muda C on 22 January 2014. On 25 March, Andik scored his first league goal in the 2014 Malaysia Super League for Selangor in a 2–0 victory over Sarawak at the Sarawak State Stadium.

Andik helped Selangor FA to become the Runner-Up in the 2014 Malaysian Super League and he's one of the main reason Selangor FA managed to reach that far for the 2014 and 2015 Malaysian Super League Season. Andik also appeared as one of the Malaysian Super League Players who made one of the most assist for the 2014 Malaysian Super League Season before signing a new contract with Selangor FA for the 2015 Malaysian Super League Season to continue help Selangor FA win more cups and achievements for the 2015 Season.

Andik also holds the second fastest goal record in the Malaysia Super League history which the goal is as early as the 28th second during a match against Johor Darul Ta'zim FC. While the fastest goal was scored by Ahmad Fakri Saarani who scored during the 12th second and holds the 6th place in the world's fastest goal record.

Andik has expanded his contract with Selangor FA until 2017 worth 3 billion Rupiah's making him the most paid footballer in Indonesia.

Kedah
On 9 February 2018, Andik signed a contract with another Malaysia Super League side Kedah. He has been given jersey number 30. Andik made his league debut in a 1–0 win against PKNP on 11 February 2018. On 22 June 2018, Andik scored his first league goal for Kedah against Kuala Lumpur as his team won 3–2.

Madura United
On 24 December 2018, Andik signed a contract with Liga 1 side Madura United. Andik made his Madura United debut in the first leg Round of 32 2018–19 Piala Indonesia against Cilegon United on 29 February 2019. and he also scored his first goal for the team in a 2–0 victory over Cilegon United at the Gelora Madura Stadium, he scored in the 66th minute.

Andik made his first Liga 1 appearance on 17 May 2019, coming on as a starter in a 1–5 win with Persela Lamongan at the Surajaya Stadium. On 24 May 2019, Andik scored his first goal for Madura United in a 0–1 victory over Barito Putera at the 17th May Stadium. During his career at Madura United, he made 24 league appearances and scored 2 goals for Madura United.

Bhayangkara
In 2020, Andik signed a one-year contract with Indonesian Liga 1 club Bhayangkara. Andik made his league debut in a 1–1 draw against Persik Kediri on 6 March 2020. And then, this season was suspended on 27 March 2020 due to the COVID-19 pandemic. The season was abandoned and was declared void on 20 January 2021.

On 29 August 2021, he started his match in the 2021–22 Liga 1 season for Bhayangkara in a 2–1  win over Persiraja Banda Aceh, he coming as a substitute for Renan Silva in the 80th minute. He played the full 90 minutes in the won to Bali United on 23 October. 

He played 84 minutes in the won to Madura United on 14 January 2022, where he registered two assist. On 5 December 2022, Andik scored his first league goal in the 2022–23 Liga 1 for Bhayangkara in a 3–1 victory over PSS Sleman at the Jatidiri Stadium.

Career statistics

Club

International

International goals

Honours

Club
Persebaya Surabaya
Liga Primer Indonesia: 2011
Malaysia-Indonesia Unity Cup: 2011
Indonesia Premier League runner-up: 2011–12

Selangor FA
Malaysia Cup: 2015

International
Indonesia U-21
Hassanal Bolkiah Trophy runner-up: 2012
Indonesia U-23
Southeast Asian Games  Silver medal: 2011, 2013
Islamic Solidarity Games  Silver medal: 2013
Indonesia
AFF Championship runner-up: 2016

Individual
Goal.com Asian Under-23 Best XI for 2011
2016 AFF Championship : Best Goal

References

External links
 Profile at footballmalaysia.com
 Profile at ifball.com
 

1991 births
Living people
Javanese people
People from Jember Regency
Sportspeople from East Java
Indonesian footballers
Indonesian expatriate footballers
Expatriate footballers in Malaysia
Indonesian expatriate sportspeople in Malaysia
Liga 1 (Indonesia) players
Indonesian Premier League players
Persebaya Surabaya players
Bhayangkara F.C. players
Madura United F.C. players
Selangor FA players
Kedah Darul Aman F.C. players
Malaysia Super League players
Indonesia youth international footballers
Indonesia international footballers
Association football midfielders
Southeast Asian Games silver medalists for Indonesia
Southeast Asian Games medalists in football
Competitors at the 2011 Southeast Asian Games